General Sir Edward Paget  (3 November 1775 – 13 May 1849) was a British Army officer.

Career
Born the fourth son of Henry Paget, 1st Earl of Uxbridge, Edward Paget became a cornet in the 1st Regiment of Life Guards in 1792. He was Member of Parliament (MP) for Caernarvon Boroughs from 1796 to 1806.

In 1808, he was with John Moore in Gothenburg assist the Swedish in the Finnish War. Moore's disagreements with Gustavus IV soon led to their being sent home where they were ordered to Portugal.

He served in the British Army during the Peninsular War commanding the reserve at the Battle of Corunna in 1809 and then conducting the advance to Oporto in 1809, during which he lost his right arm. He was second in command under Arthur Wellesley, 1st Duke of Wellington in 1811 and was captured by French cavalry in 1812 and kept a prisoner for two years until the end of the War.

From 1816 to 1821 he was a Groom of the Bedchamber in the service of George IV, including a period 1816-1820 when the latter was Prince Regent during the mental illness of his father, George III.

Briefly serving as the Governor of Ceylon in 1822, he was appointed Commander-in-Chief, India on 13 January 1823 and conducted the Burmese campaigns of 1824 to 1825, relinquishing his role of as Commander-in-Chief on 7 October 1825. He commanded the British troops who suppressed the Barrackpore mutiny of 1824. In 1826 he was appointed Governor of the Royal Military College, Sandhurst. He was also Governor of the Royal Hospital Chelsea from 1837 until 1849.

His eldest brother Henry William, 2nd Earl of Uxbridge (1768–1854), was in 1815 created Marquess of Anglesey and is best remembered for leading the charge of the heavy cavalry at the Battle of Waterloo.  The third eldest brother, Sir Arthur Paget (1771–1840), was an eminent diplomat during the Napoleonic Wars, the fifth, Sir Charles Paget (1778–1839), served with distinction in the navy, and rose to the rank of vice-admiral.

Legacy
The Memorials to Governors in the Chapel of the Royal Military Academy, Sandhurst includes:

References

|-

|-

1775 births
1849 deaths
British Army generals
British Army commanders of the Napoleonic Wars
British Army personnel of the Peninsular War
Knights Grand Cross of the Order of the Bath
British Commanders-in-Chief of India
Governors of British Ceylon
Governors of the Royal Military College, Sandhurst
Members of the Parliament of Great Britain for Welsh constituencies
Members of the Parliament of the United Kingdom for Welsh constituencies
UK MPs 1801–1802
UK MPs 1802–1806
Younger sons of earls
Edward
British Life Guards officers
English amputees
Members of Parliament for Caernarfon
British MPs 1796–1800